Swimming is the debut studio album by Belgian post-punk band the Names, released in 1982 by record label Les Disques du Crépuscule. It was produced by Martin Hannett.

Release history
The album was released as an LP by Crépuscule in 1982. It was reissued by Factory Benelux in 1991 on CD as Swimming + Singles, by LTM Recordings in 2000 on CD as Swimming + Singles, and again by Factory Benelux in 2013 on LP and CD as Swimming.

Reception 

AllMusic wrote: "Swimming isn't the sharpest arrow in infamous producer Martin Hannett's quiver, and the Belgian group indeed wallowed in the obscurity that journalist Jon Savage claimed they didn't deserve, but the record still fares rather well as a second-tier post-punk record".

References

External links 

 

The Names (band) albums
1982 debut albums
Albums produced by Martin Hannett